The Barcelona WCT was a men's tennis tournament played in Barcelona, Spain from 1974 through 1976. The event was part of the World Championship Tennis (WCT) circuit.

Men's singles

Doubles

References

External links
ATP archive

 
Defunct tennis tournaments in Spain
World Championship Tennis